How to Steal a Million is a 1966 American heist comedy film directed by William Wyler and starring Audrey Hepburn, Peter O'Toole, Eli Wallach, Hugh Griffith, and Charles Boyer. The film is set and was filmed in Paris, though the characters speak entirely in English. Hepburn's clothes were designed by Givenchy.

Plot
Prominent Paris art collector Charles Bonnet forges and sells famous artists' paintings. His disapproving daughter, Nicole, constantly fears that he will be caught. Late one night at their mansion, Nicole encounters a burglar, Simon Dermott, holding her father's forged "Van Gogh". She threatens him with an antique gun that accidentally fires, slightly wounding his arm. Wanting to avoid an investigation that would uncover her father's fake masterpieces, Nicole does not contact the police, and instead takes the charming Simon to his lavish hotel, driving him in his expensive sports car.

For an important exhibition in Paris, Charles is lending to the Kléber-Lafayette Museum his renowned "Cellini" Venus statuette that was actually sculpted by his father. Charles has never sold it because scientific testing would reveal that the "million-dollar" artwork is fake, and his entire collection would then be suspected. Charles signs the museum's standard insurance policy, then learns it includes his consent to just such a forensic examination. However, withdrawing the Venus from the exhibition would also raise suspicions. Desperate to protect her father, Nicole seeks Simon and asks him to steal the Venus before the examination. Unknown to Nicole, Simon is actually an expert consultant and investigator hired by major art galleries to enhance security and detect forgeries. He was investigating Charles' art collection when Nicole first encountered him. He initially believes that it is impossible to steal the Venus in any case and refuses to help Nicole, but changes his mind upon realizing he loves her. 

American tycoon Davis Leland, an avid art collector, becomes obsessed with owning the Venus. He meets Nicole solely to purchase the statue, but becomes attracted to her. At their second meeting, he proposes marriage to ensure he can acquire her art, but Nicole must rush off to the museum for the "heist", so she accepts his ring in a hurry. When she mentions this to Simon, he tries to hide his disappointment.

Nicole and Simon hide in the museum's utility closet until closing time. After observing the guards' routine, Simon repeatedly sets off the security alarm with the help of a boomerang until the "faulty" system is finally disabled. Simon notices Nicole's resemblance to the Venus, and she admits that her grandfather sculpted the statuette and that her grandmother was the model; he in turn admits that he knew all along the Venus was worthless and only agreed to the heist for her. Simon steals the Venus, and Nicole, disguised as a cleaning woman, hides it in a bucket. When the Venus is discovered missing, they escape in the ensuing chaos.

Following the robbery, Leland seeks to acquire the Venus by any means. Simon connives to "sell" it to him on condition that it never be displayed to anyone and that he never contact the Bonnet family again; Leland should expect to eventually be asked for payment. Leland runs from Nicole when she tries to return her engagement ring, so Simon secretly adds the ring to the package.

Nicole meets Simon to celebrate their success. He says the Cellini Venus was his first heist too and reveals his true occupation of exposing forgeries, but implies he has no intentions of exposing her or her father to the authorities because she means too much to him. He then meets Charles and assures him that the statue will be safely out of the country. Charles is so relieved that he is only momentarily disappointed when Simon says that the purchase price was zero dollars (and because the statuette was never authenticated, there is no insurance). Simon tells Charles that one of them must retire, and Charles agrees to give up forgery.

As Nicole and Simon prepare to marry, a collector who had earlier admired Charles's new "Van Gogh" arrives at the Bonnet residence and is warmly welcomed by the wily forger. Nicole says the man is a "cousin". Simon admires her newfound flair for lying, and they drive off to begin their new life together.

Cast

Reception
In a New York Times review, critic Bosley Crowther called the plot "preposterous" but added, "It is still a delightful lot of flummery while it is going on, especially the major, central business of burglarizing the museum."

On Rotten Tomatoes, the film holds an approval rating of 100% based on reviews from 11 critics, with an average rating of 7.1/10.

Box office
According to Fox records, the film needed to earn $12 million in rentals to break even and made $10.45 million, meaning it made a loss.

Popular culture
 A verbal exchange between Nicole and her father during the film ("Papa!" "Nicole") was borrowed and adapted in a successful series of commercials for the Renault Clio. 
 The robbery scenes in the film were copied for the Hindi film Loafer (1973) and the Tamil film Lingaa (2014).
 The robbery scenes are copied in the Argentine film Heroic Losers (2019). In that film, the characters are inspired by How to Steal a Million to commit their crimes.

References

Bibliography

External links
 
 
 
 

1966 films
1966 crime films
1966 romantic comedy films
1960s American films
1960s crime comedy films
1960s English-language films
1960s heist films
20th Century Fox films
American crime comedy films
American heist films
American romantic comedy films
Films about art forgery
Films based on American short stories
Films directed by William Wyler
Films scored by John Williams
Films set in museums
Films set in Paris
Films shot at Billancourt Studios
Films with screenplays by Harry Kurnitz
Romantic crime films